"Terrific" is a song by the singer-songwriter Drake Bell, released in 2011 and the only single from his EP, A Reminder. It was the first song he had released since 2008, and the first not to be co-written with either Michael Corcoran or C.J. Abraham. Though the song did not chart in the U.S., it debuted at number 1 on Mexico's charts. A music video was released on YouTube.

References

2011 singles
Drake Bell songs
Songs written by Drake Bell
2011 songs